Sir William Wilkinson Addison (4 April 1905 – 1 November 1992) was an English historian, writer and jurist. He is significant for his research and books on Essex and East Anglian subjects.

Biography 
William Addison was born in 1905 at Mitton, now in the Ribble Valley of Lancashire, England. His direct ancestors were from King's Meaburn—then Westmorland, now Cumbria—and were 14th-century tenants from Grasmere to Bowness. The Addison family were borough administrators and recorders at Clitheroe, one a Constable of Lancaster Castle, and supported the restoration of parish churches and two grammar schools, one of which, Clitheroe Royal Grammar School, William Addison attended.

After Addison's marriage in 1929 to Phoebe Dean, daughter of Robert Dean of Rimington, then in the West Riding of Yorkshire, the couple moved to Suffolk, and then to Buckhurst Hill on the edge of Epping Forest, Essex. Addison bought a bookshop in the neighbouring town of Loughton, and began his lifelong association with Epping Forest which resulted in books on the history and people of the area. He became an elected Verderer of the forest from 1954 to 1984 and chaired history organizations including the Essex Archaeological and Historical Congress and Waltham Abbey Historical Society. He was a founder member of the Friends of Essex Churches, and later its president, and was vice president of the Association of Genealogists and Record Agents (1985-1988),  and the Council for the Protection of Rural England (from 1984). Addison was chairman of the Editorial and County Committee for the Victoria County History of Essex.Hagger, Nicholas (2012); A View of Epping Forest, O Books, pp.3, 260, 272. 

Addison was a magistrate for more than twenty-five years, becoming a Justice of the Peace in 1949, and Chairman of the Epping, and the Epping and Ongar Petty Sessions in 1955. From 1959 he advised and sat on the Council of the Magistrates’ Association, later becoming its chairman from 1970 to 1976. In 1973 Addison was appointed a Deputy Lieutenant of Essex. He was knighted in 1974 for services to public life.

William Addison wrote twenty books on historic aspects and prominent people of East Anglia, Essex, and Epping Forest, and wrote poems from 1936 to his death in his eighty-seventh year. He owned a bookshop at 169 High Road, Loughton, which is marked by a blue plaque.

Publications

1945 – Epping Forest. Its literary and historical associations, J. M. Dent
1947 – The English Country Parson, J. M. Dent
1949 – Essex Heyday, J. M. Dent
1950 – Suffolk. County Books Series
1951 – English Spas, Batsford
1951 – Worthy Dr. Fuller, J. M. Dent
1953 – Audley End, etc. With special reference to the Howard family, J. M. Dent
1953 – English Fairs and Markets, Batsford
1954 – Thames Estuary, Regional Books Series, Robert Hale
1955 – In the steps of Charles Dickens, Rich & Cowan
1973 – Essex worthies: a biographical companion to the county, Phillimore. 
1973 – Wanstead Park, Corporation of London
1977 – Portrait of Epping Forest, Robert Hale. 
1977 – Queen Elizabeth's Hunting Lodge and Epping Forest Museum, Conservators of Epping Forest
1978 – Understanding English surnames, Batsford. 
1979 – Understanding English Place Names, Batsford. 
1980 – The Old Roads of England, HarperCollins. 
1982 – Local Styles of the English Parish Church, Batsford. 
1986 – Farmhouses in the English Landscape, Robert Hale. 
1991 – Epping Forest: Figures in a Landscape, Robert Hale. 
2002 – Addison William; Winter Forest and Other Poems'', editor: Richard Morris; illustrator: Clare Eastwood; Corporation of London (published posthumously).

Notes

References

1905 births
1992 deaths
People educated at Clitheroe Royal Grammar School
English biographers
English legal professionals
Knights Bachelor
20th-century English historians
20th-century English male writers
20th-century biographers
People from Ribble Valley (district)
People from Buckhurst Hill
English justices of the peace